Hafler is a surname.  Common uses of the name include:

David Hafler, the high-end audio designer and manufacturer
The Hafler Trio